

N

O

P

Q

R